Gbenga Oluokun (born 14 June 1983) is a boxer from Nigeria, who participated in the 2004 Summer Olympics for his native West African country. He has faced former world champions and contenders Manuel Charr, Lamon Brewster, Kubrat Pulev, Robert Helenius, Carlos Takam, Vyacheslav Glazkov, and Mariusz Wach.

Amateur
In 2003 he captured the gold medal in his weight division at the All-Africa Games in Abuja, Nigeria vs Mohamed Aly.

At the Olympics 2004 he was defeated in the round of sixteen of the super heavyweight (over 91 kg) division by Italy's eventual runner-up Roberto Cammarelle.

Professional
He turned pro afterwards and won 16 fights before being upset by Manuel Charr in 2009.

Professional boxing record

|-
|align="center" colspan=8|19 Wins (12 knockouts, 7 decisions), 14 Losses (6 knockouts, 8 decisions)
|-
| align="center" style="border-style: none none solid solid; background: #e3e3e3"|Result
| align="center" style="border-style: none none solid solid; background: #e3e3e3"|Record
| align="center" style="border-style: none none solid solid; background: #e3e3e3"|Opponent
| align="center" style="border-style: none none solid solid; background: #e3e3e3"|Type
| align="center" style="border-style: none none solid solid; background: #e3e3e3"|Round
| align="center" style="border-style: none none solid solid; background: #e3e3e3"|Date
| align="center" style="border-style: none none solid solid; background: #e3e3e3"|Location
| align="center" style="border-style: none none solid solid; background: #e3e3e3"|Notes
|-
|Loss
|
|align=left| Krzysztof Zimnoch
|KO
|
|
|align=left| Wieliczka, Poland
|align=left|
|-

|Loss
|
|align=left| Marcin Rekowski
|KO
|5 (8)
|10/04/2015
|align=left| Gliwice, Poland
|align=left|
|-
|Loss
|
|align=left| Mariusz Wach
|UD
|10
|14/03/2015
|align=left| RCS Lubin, Lubin, Poland
|align=left|
|-
|Win
|
|align=left| Sascha Brinkmann
|KO
|2 (6)
|13/12/2014
|align=left| Unihalle Wuppertal, Nordrhein-Westfalen, Germany
|align=left|
|-
|Loss
|
|align=left| Agit Kabayel
|SD
|10
|22/03/2014
|align=left| Atatürk Spor Salonu, Tekirdağ, Turkey
|align=left|
|-
|Loss
|
|align=left| Edmund Gerber
|UD
|8
|23/08/2013
|align=left| GETEC Arena, Magdeburg, Germany
|align=left|
|-
|Loss
|
|align=left| Erkan Teper
|UD
|8
|14/09/2012
|align=left| Halle an der Saale, Germany
|align=left|
|-
|Loss
|
|align=left| Vyacheslav Glazkov
|TKO
|7
|01/05/2012
|align=left| Krylatskoe Sport Palace, Moscow, Russia
|align=left|
|-
|Loss
|
|align=left| Carlos Takam
|RTD
|6
|29/04/2011
|align=left| Espace Roger Boisrame, Pontault-Combault, France
|align=left|
|-
|Win
|
|align=left| Konstantin Airich
|TKO
|4
|12/11/2010
|align=left| HanseDom, Stralsund, Germany
|align=left|
|-
|Loss
|
|align=left| Oleg Platov
|TKO
|6
|05/06/2010
|align=left| Jahnsportforum, Neubrandenburg, Germany
|align=left|
|-
|Loss
|
|align=left| Pavel Zhuralev
|UD
|3
|07/05/2010
|align=left| Pavilion Nicosia, Nicosia, Cyprus
|align=left|
|-
|Loss
|
|align=left| Robert Helenius
|UD
|8
|26/03/2010
|align=left| Töölö Sports Hall, Helsinki, Finland
|align=left|
|-
|Loss
|
|align=left| Kubrat Pulev
|UD
|6
|07/11/2009
|align=left| Nuremberg Arena, Nuremberg, Germany
|align=left|
|-
|Loss
|
|align=left| Rene Dettweiler
|UD
|8
|17/10/2009
|align=left| O2 World Arena, Berlin, Germany
|align=left|
|-
|Win
|
|align=left| Lamon Brewster
|UD
|8
|29/08/2009
|align=left| Gerry Weber Stadium, Halle, Germany
|align=left|
|-
|Loss
|
|align=left| Manuel Charr
|KO
|7
|25/04/2009
|align=left| König Palast, Krefeld, Germany
|align=left|
|-
|Win
|
|align=left| Petr Sedlak
|TKO
|2
|10/05/2008
|align=left| Brandberge Arena, Halle an der Saale, Germany
|align=left|
|-
|Win
|
|align=left| Raphael Zumbano Love
|UD
|8
|08/03/2008
|align=left| König Palast, Krefeld, Germany
|align=left|
|-
|Win
|
|align=left| Edgars Kalnars
|KO
|3
|04/12/2007
|align=left| Freizeit Arena, Soelden, Austria
|align=left|
|-
|Win
|
|align=left| Humberto Evora
|KO
|4
|07/11/2007
|align=left| Soelden
|align=left|
|-
|Win
|
|align=left| Alexander Vasiliev
|KO
|8
|14/07/2007
|align=left| Color Line Arena, Hamburg, Germany
|align=left|
|-
|Win
|
|align=left| Alexey Varakin
|KO
|4
|07/04/2007
|align=left| Universum Gym, Wandsbek, Germany
|align=left|
|-
|Win
|
|align=left| Daniil Peretyatko
|UD
|6
|13/01/2007
|align=left| Brandberge Arena, Halle an der Saale, Germany
|align=left|
|-
|Win
|
|align=left| Antoine Palatis
|TKO
|6
|21/11/2006
|align=left| Universum Gym, Wandsbek, Germany
|align=left|
|-
|Win
|
|align=left| Yaroslav Zavorotnyi
|MD
|6
|19/09/2006
|align=left| Kugelbake-Halle, Cuxhaven, Germany
|align=left|
|-
|Win
|
|align=left| Mindaugas Kulikauskas
|UD
|6
|22/08/2006
|align=left| Universum Gym, Hamburg, Germany
|align=left|
|-
|Win
|
|align=left| Aleksandrs Borhovs
|TKO
|2
|25/07/2006
|align=left| Sportschule Sachsenwald, Hamburg, Germany
|align=left|
|-
|Win
|
|align=left| Mihai Iftode
|RTD
|3
|15/04/2006
|align=left| Maritim Hotel, Magdeburg, Germany
|align=left|
|-
|Win
|
|align=left| Tomasz Zeprzalka
|MD
|4
|07/03/2006
|align=left| Kugelbake Halle, Cuxhaven, Germany
|align=left|
|-
|Win
|
|align=left| Peter Oravec
|TKO
|1
|14/01/2006
|align=left| Ballhaus Arena, Aschersleben, Germany
|align=left|
|-
|Win
|
|align=left| Sandor Forgacs
|TKO
|1
|26/11/2005
|align=left| Wilhelm Dopatka Halle, Leverkusen, Germany
|align=left|
|-
|Win
|
|align=left| Vlado Szabo
|UD
|4
|28/09/2005
|align=left| Color Line Arena, Hamburg, Germany
|align=left|
|}

External links
 
 News and Pictures of Gbenga Oloukun

1983 births
Yoruba sportspeople
Olympic boxers of Nigeria
Living people
Boxers at the 2004 Summer Olympics
Nigerian male boxers
People from Oyo State
African Games gold medalists for Nigeria
African Games medalists in boxing
Competitors at the 2003 All-Africa Games
Super-heavyweight boxers